John Andrew "Baby Grand" Scafide (June 21, 1911 – October 24, 1979) was an American football offensive lineman in the National Football League for the Boston Redskins. He played college football at Tulane University. Scafide served 16 years as mayor of his native Bay St. Louis, Mississippi.

Early years
John Scafide was born on June 21, 1911 in Bay St. Louis, Mississippi; one of 13 children born to Italian immigrants. He attended high school at Saint Stanislaus College in Bay St. Louis, playing for the "Rock-a-Chaws."

Football

College
Scafide was an All-Southern guard for the Tulane Green Wave of Tulane University,  a member of its team which made an appearance in the 1932 Rose Bowl. He  was inducted into the Tulane Athletic Hall of Fame in 1985.

Mayor
Scafide served as mayor of Bay St. Louis from Bay from 1953 to 1969.

References

1911 births
1979 deaths
People from Bay St. Louis, Mississippi
American football offensive tackles
Boston Redskins players
All-Southern college football players
Tulane Green Wave football players
American people of Italian descent
American football guards
American football tackles